In mathematics, a pairing function is a process to uniquely encode two natural numbers into a single natural number.

Any pairing function can be used in set theory to prove that integers and rational numbers have the same cardinality as natural numbers.

Definition
A pairing function is a bijection

Hopcroft and Ullman pairing function 
Hopcroft and Ullman (1979) define the following pairing function: , where . This is the same as the Cantor pairing function below, shifted to exclude 0 (i.e., and ).

Cantor pairing function 

The Cantor pairing function is a primitive recursive pairing function

defined by 

where .

It is also strictly monotonic w.r.t. each argument, that is, for all , if , then ; similarly, if , then .

The statement that this is the only quadratic pairing function is known as the Fueter–Pólya theorem. Whether this is the only polynomial pairing function is still an open question.

This definition can be inductively generalized to the 

with the base case defined above for a pair:

Inverting the Cantor pairing function 
Let  be an arbitrary natural number. We will show that there exist unique values  such that

and hence that the function  is invertible. It is helpful to define some intermediate values in the calculation: 

If we solve the quadratic equation 

which is a strictly increasing and continuous function when  is non-negative real. Since 

we get that 

and thus 

where  is the floor function.

Since the Cantor pairing function is invertible, it must be one-to-one and onto.

Examples 

To calculate :
,
,
,
,
,
so .

To find  and  such that :
,
,
,
,
,
,
so ;
,
,
,
so ;
,
so ;
,
so ; thus .

Derivation 

The graphical shape of Cantor's pairing function, a diagonal progression, is a standard trick in working with infinite sequences and countability. The algebraic rules of this diagonal-shaped function can verify its validity for a range of polynomials, of which a quadratic will turn out to be the simplest, using the method of induction. Indeed, this same technique can also be followed to try and derive any number of other functions for any variety of schemes for enumerating the plane.

A pairing function can usually be defined inductively – that is, given the th pair, what is the th pair? The way Cantor's function progresses diagonally across the plane can be expressed as
.

The function must also define what to do when it hits the boundaries of the 1st quadrant – Cantor's pairing function resets back to the x-axis to resume its diagonal progression one step further out, or algebraically:
.

Also we need to define the starting point, what will be the initial step in our induction method: .

Assume that there is a quadratic 2-dimensional polynomial that can fit these conditions (if there were not, one could just repeat by trying a higher-degree polynomial). The general form is then
.

Plug in our initial and boundary conditions to get  and:
,

so we can match our  terms to get

.

.

Therefore

is the Cantor pairing function, and we also demonstrated through the derivation that this satisfies all the conditions of induction.

Other pairing functions 
The function  is a pairing function.

In 1990, Regan proposed the first known pairing function that is computable in linear time and with constant space (as the previously known examples can only be computed in linear time iff multiplication can be too, which is doubtful). In fact, both this pairing function and its inverse can be computed with finite-state transducers that run in real time. In the same paper, the author proposed two more monotone pairing functions that can be computed online in linear time and with logarithmic space; the first can also be computed offline with zero space.

In 2001, Pigeon proposed a pairing function based on bit-interleaving, defined recursively as:

In 2006, Szudzik proposed a "more elegant" pairing function defined by the expression:

Which can be unpaired using the expression:

(Qualitatively, it assigns consecutive numbers to pairs along the edges of squares.) This pairing function orders SK combinator calculus expressions by depth.
used to establish  for any infinite cardinal  in ZFC.
Define on  the binary relation

 is then shown to be a well-ordering such that every element has  predecessors, which implies that .
(See also Talk:Tarski's theorem about choice#Proof of the converse.)

Notes

References

Set theory
Georg Cantor
Functions and mappings